Hyponerita lavinia is a moth of the subfamily Arctiinae first described by Herbert Druce in 1890. It is found in French Guiana, Guyana and Bolivia.

References

Moths described in 1890
Phaegopterina